ISCO or Isco may refer to:

Isco (born 1992), Spanish footballer
Innermost stable circular orbit, The smallest stable orbit around a black hole
International Standard Classification of Occupations, an International Labour Organization (ILO) classification structure
Information Sharing Customer Outreach, a directorate within the office of the Chief Information Officer (CIO) under the Office of the Director of National Intelligence (ODNI) of the U.S.A.
In situ chemical oxidation, a way to remediate organic contamination below the ground surface by direct injection of oxidants
ISCO (videogame developer) of Japan

See also